Mahajangasuchidae is an extinct family of notosuchian crocodyliforms. It currently contains two genera, Mahajangasuchus and Kaprosuchus, both of which lived during the Late Cretaceous in Gondwana. It is defined as the most inclusive clade containing Mahajangasuchus insignis but not Notosuchus terrestris, Simosuchus clarki, Araripesuchus gomesii, Baurusuchus pachecoi,  Peirosaurus torminni, Goniopholis crassidens,
Pholidosaurus schaumbergensis, or Crocodylus niloticus. Phylogenetically, Mahajangasuchidae is placed just outside pholidosaurids and more derived neosuchians.

Defining characters of the family include fused nasals, a jaw articulation below the posterior maxillary tooth row, a deep mandibular symphysis that is oriented anterodorsally, and the formation of a hornlike posterodorsal process from the squamosal and parietal (which is much more pronounced in Kaprosuchus).

Phylogeny 

Cladogram showing the phylogenetic relationship of Mahajangasuchidae within Neosuchia after Sereno and Larsson, 2009:

In 2014, Mahajangasuchidae were grouped within Notosuchia:

The cladogram following by Nicholl et al. 2021:

See also
 Sebecosuchia - another group of terrestrial crocodylomorphs.

References

Terrestrial crocodylomorphs
Late Cretaceous crocodylomorphs
Prehistoric reptiles of Africa
Notosuchians
Cenomanian first appearances
Maastrichtian extinctions
Prehistoric reptile families